James Murrell Shackelford (July 7, 1827 – September 7, 1907) was a lawyer, judge, and general in the Union Army during the American Civil War. He has the distinction of having captured Confederate cavalry commander John Hunt Morgan in mid-1863, effectively ending "Morgan's Raid".

Early life
Shackelford was born in Kentucky in 1827 to a family with roots in Tidewater Virginia in the 17th century. As a young age, Shackelford joined a regiment of Kentucky volunteers as a second lieutenant in time for the Mexican War. The fighting had subsided by the time the regiment reached Mexico, but Shackelford's soldierly conduct won him a promotion to first lieutenant.

He returned to Kentucky and began studying law at the office of a local judge and was admitted to the bar in 1851. His legal career grew in prominence until interrupted by the Civil War.

Civil War service
Shackelford was appointed colonel of the 25th Kentucky Infantry on January 1, 1862. His regiment joined Lew Wallace's division during the Battle of Fort Donelson. Exposure to the elements at Fort Donelson forced Shackelford to resign on March 24, 1862, on account of poor health. During his convalescence, Shackelford helped recruit another regiment of Kentucky volunteers which was mustered in as the 8th Kentucky Cavalry with Shackelford as colonel. A few months later, on January 1, 1863, he was promoted to Brigadier General of Volunteers and assigned to command the 1st Brigade, 2nd Division, XXIII Corps.

In July of that year, Shackelford took part in Edward Hobson's expedition in pursuit of the noted Confederate raider, John Hunt Morgan. Union forces caught up with Morgan at the Battle of Buffington Island in southern Ohio. Half of the Confederate force surrendered but nearly 400, including Morgan escaped along the north bank of the Ohio River. Shackelford's brigade finally cut off Morgan's remaining force at the Battle of Salineville in northeastern Ohio.

Later that year, as Ambrose E. Burnside marched toward Knoxville, Tennessee, he bypassed the Cumberland Gap, leaving a single brigade posted there. Burnside occupied Knoxville on September 1, 1863, and turned his attention back to the Cumberland Gap, dispatching Shackelford's brigade. Shackelford demanded that Confederate general John W. Frazer surrender the gap, but Frazer refused. Burnside personally arrived with reinforcements and forced the Confederates to surrender. Later in the month, Shackelford was promoted to command a division in the XXIII Corps and then in November to command of the Cavalry Corps in the Army of the Ohio. Shackelford's cavalry helped to secure the vital cross roads at the Battle of Campbell's Station and participated in the Siege of Knoxville. When James Longstreet's Confederate forces retreated from Knoxville, Shackelford was sent in pursuit.  He caught up with the Confederates, but in the Battle of Bean's Station Longstreet checked the Union pursuit before withdrawing from the region.

Later life
On January 18, 1864, Shackelford unexpectedly resigned from the army on account of the death of his wife.  He moved to Evansville, Indiana, and resumed his law practice.

Move to Indian Territory
Before 1889, there were no federal courts in Indian Territory, since only tribal courts operated there. However, when land was opened to settlement by immigrants from the Eastern states, there was an influx of lawyers capable of practicing in American courts.  Some of these, such as Elias Cornelius Boudinot, had been living in Fort Smith, where they could represent clients living in Indian Territory before Judge Parker's Federal Court. By moving to Muskogee, they could serve clients involved in either one of the tribal courts or in the new Federal District court, which officially opened on April 1, 1889.

Federal Judge in Indian Territory
In 1883, Congress realized that legal issues in Indian Territory had overwhelmed the resources of Judge Isaac C. Parker's court in Fort Smith, Arkansas. It decided that Indian Territory should have its own Federal court, which it created on January 6, 1883.
It began this process by assigning portions of the Territory to Judicial Districts in Kansas and Texas. All of Indian Territory north of the Canadian River and east of the 100th meridian, except for the Cherokee, Creek and Seminole nations were attached to the District of Kansas, which had courthouses at Wichita and Fort Scott, Kansas. (Also included in this transfer were the Cherokee Outlet and selected rapidly-growing towns such as Enid, Guymon and Woodward). All of the remaining Indian Territory, except the Chickasaw and Choctaw Nations, was attached to the Northern District of Texas, whose courthouse was at Graham, Texas. Indian country west of the 100th meridian and the Oklahoma panhandle were left outside the scope of either federal or state jurisdictions.

In 1889 President Benjamin Harrison appointed Shackelford U.S. judge in the Indian Territory, replacing Isaac C. Parker.

Death and burial
James M. Shackelford died in the fall of 1909 at his summer home in Port Huron, Michigan. He is interred in Cave Hill Cemetery in Louisville, Kentucky.

Notes

References

Additional sources
 Eicher, John H., and Eicher, David J., Civil War High Commands, Stanford University Press, 2001, .
 Logan, James K. ed. The Federal Courts of the Tenth Circuit:A History, Volumes 62–63. 1992. Available on Google Books.

Union Army generals
People of Kentucky in the American Civil War
American military personnel of the Mexican–American War
People from Lincoln County, Kentucky
Indiana lawyers
Pre-statehood history of Oklahoma
People from Muskogee, Oklahoma
Burials at Cave Hill Cemetery
1827 births
1909 deaths